Staroye Bibeyevo is a rural locality (a village) in Malyshevskoye Rural Settlement, Selivanovsky District, Vladimir Oblast, Russia. The population was 6 as of 2010.

Geography 
Staroye Bibeyevo is located on the Ushna River, 38 km southwest from Krasnaya Gorbatka (the district's administrative centre) by road. Novoye Bibeyevo is the nearest rural locality.

References 

Rural localities in Selivanovsky District